Towed in a Hole is a 1932 pre-Code comedy film starring Laurel and Hardy. The "two-reeler" short was produced by Hal Roach, directed by George Marshall, and distributed by Metro-Goldwyn-Mayer.

Plot
Laurel and Hardy are in the fish business. They drive around town seeing if they can sell any. Stan suggests they catch their own fish and keep all the profits. Ollie likes the idea of cutting out the "middleman" so they buy a boat at a junk yard. After testing it for leaks by filling it with water and some setbacks such as dropping an anchor through the hull and sawing through the mast, they succeed in fixing it up. When the boat is finally ready, the whole operation goes south when they decide to hoist the sail.

Cast
 Stan Laurel as Stanley
 Oliver Hardy as Ollie
 Billy Gilbert as Joe, the junkyard owner

Production notes
Towed in a Hole was remade by The Three Stooges in 1945 as Booby Dupes.

References

External links 
 
 
 
 

1932 films
1932 comedy films
American black-and-white films
Films directed by George Marshall
Laurel and Hardy (film series)
1932 short films
Metro-Goldwyn-Mayer short films
American comedy short films
1930s English-language films
1930s American films